The  was an electric multiple unit (EMU) train type introduced in 1985 by Japanese National Railways (JNR), and later operated by West Japan Railway Company (JR-West) on local services along the Japan Sea coast of Japan until March 2011. They were converted from former 583 series sleeping car EMUs in the 1980s.

Formations

Sets D01-D09
KuMoHa 419 + MoHa 418 + KuHa 418

(MoHa 418 cars each had one PS16 pantograph.)

Sets D10-D15
KuMoHa 419 + MoHa 418 + KuHa 419

(MoHa 418 cars each had one PS16 pantograph.)

Interior

History

The 419 series sets were converted from surplus former 583 series sleeping car EMUs and entered service from the start of the revised timetable in March 1985.

Following the introduction of new 521 series EMUs in late 2006, two sets, D10 and D13, were withdrawn in March 2007. The remaining sets were finally withdrawn on 11 March 2011.

KuHa 418-1 from set D01 was preserved at a locomotive scrapping facility in Takaoka starting in 2012; it was removed from display around November 2021 and subsequently scrapped.

See also
 715 series, similar EMUs used in the north-east Japan and northern Kyushu

References

Further reading
 

Electric multiple units of Japan
West Japan Railway Company
Train-related introductions in 1985

ja:国鉄419系・715系電車
1500 V DC multiple units of Japan
20 kV AC multiple units